Ingolstadt Manching Airfield, or Fliegerhorst Ingolstadt/Manching in German , is a military airbase with civil usage located in Manching near Ingolstadt, Germany.

Usage
The airfield is home to the Bundeswehr Technical and Airworthiness Center for Aircraft.. The first flights of the Panavia Tornado and Eurofighter prototypes took place here. The F-104G Starfighter and the F-4 Phantom II fighter aircraft were flown here testing weapons systems in the 1960s, 70s and 80s.
During the Space Shuttle missions it was considered as a landing site for Transoceanic Abort Landings.

Cassidian, the defence and security subsidiary of EADS (now renamed Airbus Defence and Space), also had its headquarters here. Manching is now a key center for Airbus' military air systems activity in Germany including the support of Luftwaffe aircraft.

Airlines and destinations
Private Wings offers some business on demand charters and seasonal scheduled leisure flights across Europe. Ingolstadt Manching also receives frequent charter flights from Braunschweig-Wolfsburg Airport transferring personnel of the Volkswagen Group between their headquarters in Wolfsburg and their subsidiary Audi in Ingolstadt.

See also
 Transport in Germany
 List of airports in Germany

References

External links

 Official website
 
 
 

Ingo
Pfaffenhofen (district)